Tavarnelle may refer to places in Italy:

 Barberino Tavarnelle, a commune
 Tavarnelle Val di Pesa, a part of Barberino Tavarnelle
 A.S.D. San Donato Tavarnelle, an Italian association football club

See also
 Tavernelle (disambiguation)